The 2014 Horizon League women's basketball tournament was a tournament from March 10 through March 16. The first round, quarterfinals and semifinals will be broadcast on the Horizon League Network, while the championship will be on ESPNU. The tournament champion will receive an automatic bid to the 2014 NCAA tournament.

Seeds
All 9 Horizon League schools participated in the tournament. Teams are seeded by 2013–14 Horizon League season record. The top 7 teams received a first-round bye.

Seeding for the tournament was determined at the close of the regular conference season:

Schedule

Bracket

References

External links
 Horizon League Women's Basketball

2013–14 Horizon League women's basketball season
Horizon League women's basketball tournament